Literomancy, from the Latin litero, "letter", mancy, "divination", is a form of fortune-telling based on written words, or, in the case of Chinese, characters. A fortune-teller of this type is known as a literomancer.

When practicing literomancy, the client puts up a subject, be it a single character or a name. The literomancer then analyzes the subject, the client's choice of subject or other information related to the subject, along with other information he sees in the client or that the client supplies to arrive at a divination.

Some literomancers can read the curves and lines of a signature as signed by an individual, just as a professional handwriting analyst might, but uses instinct and divination techniques rather than applied analysis skills.

As a superstition, literomancy is practised in Chinese-speaking communities and known as cèzì. The subjects of a literomancy are traditionally single characters and the requestor's name (Chinese believe that the name can affect one's destiny). In modern times, elements such as foreign words or even more recently, e-mail addresses and instant message handles have come into use as a subject.

External links
An example of fortune-telling with a Chinese name

Superstitions
Divination
Chinese language
Chinese culture